Depressaria fusconigerella is a moth in the family Depressariidae. It was described by Hanneman in 1990.

References

Moths described in 1990
Depressaria